Nestor Cambier (1879–1957) was a Belgian artist and draftsman whose portraits were compared favourably with those of John Singer Sargent but who now is largely forgotten. He also painted landscapes, city and interior views, still-lives, murals and stained glass, and also produced numerous pencil and chalk drawings.

Early life and training
Cambier was born in Couillet (now part of Charleroi) in Belgium. He studied at the college of Ixelles, Brussels before entering the Académie Royale des Beaux-Arts in Brussels, where he studied portraiture under the masters Joseph Stallaert and Gustave Vanaise until 1900. At age 21 he had already exhibited at the Brussels Salon, with a portrait of a young girl and a landscape.

Professional life
In 1903, Cambier exhibited at the Triennial Salon of Beaux Arts at Brussels with pictures of a Brabançon innkeeper, a colourful Bazaar, a large tableau of the Cid and the Leper, and a study in pastels of Salome.

He went to the United States (1906–1909), working first at Ascenzo's studios. He continued to paint portraits and in 1907 exhibited at the Academy of Fine Art in Philadelphia, Pennsylvania where he won the John Wanamaker prize. He designed large stained glass windows for the Cathedral Basilica of the Sacred Heart,
, Newark, New Jersey, while it was under construction. (Recent investigation shows that delays in construction resulted in the 214 stained glass windows not being completed until 1950, by when they had been redesigned by Franz Zettler.)

Cambier returned to Belgium in 1909, where he painted further portraits and extended his painting to landscapes. In 1914 he held an exhibition of his works at Blankenberge, Belgium, where he was almost trapped when Germany invaded Belgium at the start of the First World War, and which resulted in the loss of many of his canvasses.

He then spent 19 years intermittently in the United Kingdom (1914–1933), and in 1915 and 1916 he donated some of his works for auction on behalf of the British Red Cross, reaching prices comparable with the best English painters. In 1923 he became a member of the North British Academy of Arts, and became a resident guest of Sir Henry and Lady Barber at Culham Court, near Henley, Oxfordshire. During this time, he painted numerous portraits of Lady Barber (1869–1932), and pictures of the interior of Culham Court and the surrounding countryside.

Posthumous fame
Following his death in Brussels in 1957, a retrospective show of Cambier's art was held in Brussels in 1967 at the Baron René Steens gallery. His works are allegedly displayed in Birmingham, London, Paris, Rheims and Lausanne.

Perhaps the largest collection of Cambier's paintings (25, plus numerous photographs and memorabilia) are held by The Barber Institute of Fine Arts, founded by Dame Martha Constance Hattie Barber (1869–1933) at Birmingham University, who married the solicitor and property developer, William Henry Barber, a highly successful businessman who made his fortune in the expanding suburbs of Birmingham. By the mid 1930s he and Lady Barber were able to retire to Culham Court, an 18th-century estate in Oxfordshire. Between 1914 and 1930, Cambier was a frequent visitor and resident there, where he painted landscapes of the estate and painted eighteen portraits commissioned by Lady Barber as presents for her husband. Lord Barber died in 1927, and Lady Barber founded the institute in 1932 to which all the paintings were transferred. Cambier's other paintings appear to be dispersed in private hands.

Honours 
 1924 : Knight of the Order of the Crown.

Gallery

Catalogue

Dated worksPCF (Public Catalogue Foundation) of Oil Paintings in Public Ownership, Birmingham Collections 2011
Paintings held by the Barber Institute of Fine Arts marked *

Undated pictures
unless otherwise indicated

Royal Museums of Fine Arts of Belgium, Illustrations of volumes by R. Bazin, Comte Carton de Wiart (Mes Vacances av Congo), Charcot.

Original drawing on the fly leaf of a catalogue. Type Brugeois, portrait sketch in colour pencil ca. 9 x 7 cm.

Vivid portrait sketch made by the artist while visiting the Bruges Salon of 1913–14, made on the fly-leave of the Salon Catalogue: Cercle Artistique Brugeois, XXXVIe Salon, in-8°, 21.5 x 11 cm, stapled, original stiff wrapper. Nestor Cambier was represented by 5 paintings. Of these 4 were marked in red by him with the remark that they were stolen by the Germans at Blankenberg.

Undated portraits

References

External links
 North British Academy of Arts
 http://users.skynet.be/spybel/cambier_nestor.htm
 http://www.findartinfo.com
 http://www.opac-fabritius.be/fr/F_database.htm
 http://www.thepcf.org.uk

1879 births
1957 deaths
Artists from Charleroi
20th-century Belgian painters
Knights of the Order of the Crown (Belgium)
Académie Royale des Beaux-Arts alumni